The Second Track is a 1962 East German drama film directed by Joachim Kunert. It is the only DEFA film looking at the Nazi Germany history in East Germany.

Cast 
 Albert Hetterle - Walter Brock
 Annekathrin Bürger - Vera Brock - seine Tochter
  - Frank
  - Erwin Runge
 Helga Göring - Frau Gertrud Runge
  - Heinz Gericke
  - Frau Anneliese Merkel
 Brigitte Lindenberg - Angestellte im Kdh.
  - Kriminalbeamter
  - Lokführer

References

External links 

1962 films
1962 drama films
East German films
1960s German films